Mamuju may refer to:

 Mamuju (city), capital of West Sulawesi, Indonesia
 Mamuju Regency, subdistrict of West Sulawesi
 Mamuju language, spoken in Sulawesi, Indonesia